The Islamic Research Institute (IRI) was formerly a research division of the Government of Pakistan. It was founded in 1960 as a result of a constitutional requirement. In 1980, it became the research institute of the recently founded International Islamic University, Islamabad. The Institute remained a section of the University when it acquired its new charter as International Islamic University in 1985.

In order to help Pakistani society and the Muslim Ummah live in accordance with Islamic principles, the Institute's main goals are to develop the research methods for research in the different fields of Islamic learning, identify current issues, and study and interpret Islamic teachings in light of modern intellectual and scientific advancement.

Muhammad Khalid Masud  is serving as the current director general.

Dr. Muhammad Hamidullah Library
The library which is named after the well known scholar Muhammad Hamidullah, it is located in Faisal Masjid campus has more than 200,000 books on various subjects. Since October 2019, the library has been open to membership which is now accessible to the general public.

In the library, a regular study center has been built on Muhammad, while the Quran, religions and comparative religions, Islamic and other laws, Islamic Shari'a, history of Pakistan, including 180,000 books of very high quality.

Journals

Islamic Studies
Islamic Studies is a peer reviewed internationally research journal since 1962, published by Islamic Research Institute.

Fikr-o-Nazar
Fikr-u-Nazar is a quarterly online journal of IRI.

References

1960 establishments in Pakistan
International Islamic University, Islamabad
Research institutes established in 1960
Research institutes in Pakistan